This is a complete listing of Local Education Agency (LEA), or public school districts in the state of Michigan.

 For intermediate school districts (ISDs), see list of intermediate school districts in Michigan.
 For public school academy (PSA) districts, which include charter schools, see list of public school academy districts in Michigan.

Allegan Area Educational Service Agency

Allegan County
Allegan Public Schools
Fennville Public Schools
Glenn Public School District
Hopkins Public Schools
Martin Public Schools (also extends into Barry County)
Otsego Public Schools (also extends into Kalamazoo and Van Buren Counties)
Plainwell Community Schools (also extends into Barry and Kalamazoo Counties)
Wayland Union Schools (also extends into Barry and Kent Counties)

Alpena–Montmorency–Alcona Education Service District

Alcona County
Alcona Community Schools

Alpena County
Alpena Public Schools (also extends into Presque Isle County)

Montmorency County
Atlanta Community Schools
Hillman Community Schools (also extends into Alpena and Presque Isle Counties)

Barry Intermediate School District

Barry County
Delton-Kellogg School District (also extends into Allegan County)
Hastings Area School District (also extends into Calhoun County)

Bay–Arenac Intermediate School District

Arenac County
Au Gres-Sims School District
Standish-Sterling Community Schools (also extends into Bay and Gladwin Counties)

Bay County
Bangor Township Schools
Bay City School District (also extends into Midland and Saginaw Counties)
Essexville-Hampton Public Schools
Pinconning Area Schools (also extends into Gladwin County)

Berrien Regional Educational Service Agency

Berrien County
Benton Harbor Area Schools
Berrien Springs Public Schools
Brandywine Community Schools (also extends into Cass County)
Bridgman Public Schools
Buchanan Community Schools
Coloma Community Schools (also extends into Van Buren County)
Eau Claire Public Schools (also extends into Cass County)
Hagar Township School District 6
Lakeshore School District (Berrien)
New Buffalo Area Schools
Niles Community Schools (also extends into Cass County)
River Valley School District
Sodus Township School District 5
St. Joseph Public Schools
Watervliet School District

Branch Intermediate School District

Branch County
Bronson Community School District (also extends into St. Joseph County)
Coldwater Community Schools
Quincy Community School District (also extends into Hillsdale County)

C.O.O.R. Intermediate School District

Crawford County
Crawford AuSable Schools (also extends into Kalkaska and Otsego Counties)

Ogemaw County
West Branch-Rose City Area Schools (also extends into Gladwin and Oscoda Counties)

Oscoda County
Fairview Area School District (also extends into Alcona County)
Mio-AuSable Schools

Roscommon County
Houghton Lake Community Schools (also extends into Missaukee County)
Roscommon Area Public Schools (also extends into Crawford County)

Calhoun Intermediate School District

Calhoun County
Athens Area Schools (also extends into Branch, Kalamazoo and St. Joseph Counties)
Battle Creek Public Schools
Harper Creek Community Schools
Homer Community School District (also extends into Branch, Hillsdale and Jackson Counties)
Lakeview School District (Calhoun)
Mar Lee School District
Marshall Public Schools (also extends into Jackson County)
Pennfield Schools
Tekonsha Community Schools
Union City Community Schools (also extends into Branch County, where the district offices are located)

Eaton County
Bellevue Community Schools (also extends into Barry and Calhoun Counties)
Olivet Community Schools (also extends into Calhoun County)

Charlevoix–Emmet Intermediate School District

Antrim County
Central Lake Public Schools
Ellsworth Community School (also extends into Charlevoix County)

Charlevoix County
Beaver Island Community School
Boyne City Public Schools (also extends into Antrim County)
Boyne Falls Public School District (also extends into Antrim County)
Charlevoix Public Schools (also extends into Antrim County)
East Jordan Public Schools (also extends into Antrim County)

Emmet County
Alanson Public Schools
Harbor Springs School District
Pellston Public Schools (also extends into Cheboygan County)
Public Schools of Petoskey (also extends into Charlevoix County)

Cheboygan–Otsego–Presque Isle Education Service District

Cheboygan County
Cheboygan Area Schools
Inland Lakes Schools
Mackinaw City Public Schools (also extends into Emmet County, where the district offices are located)
Wolverine Community Schools

Otsego County
Gaylord Community Schools (also extends into Antrim County)
Johannesburg-Lewiston Area Schools (also extends into Montmorency and Oscoda Counties)
Vanderbilt Area Schools (also extends into Charlevoix County)

Presque Isle County
Onaway Area Community School District (also extends into Cheboygan County)
Posen Consolidated School District No. 9
Rogers City Area Schools

Clare–Gladwin Regional Education Service District

Clare County
Clare Public Schools (also extends into Isabella County)
Farwell Area Schools (also extends into Isabella County)
Harrison Community Schools (also extends into Gladwin County)

Gladwin County
Beaverton Schools (also extends into Clare County)
Gladwin Community Schools (also extends into Clare County)

Clinton County Regional Educational Service Agency

Clinton County
Bath Community Schools (also extends into Shiawassee County)
Dewitt Public Schools
Fowler Public Schools
Ovid-Elsie Area Schools (also extends into Gratiot, Saginaw and Shiawassee Counties)
Pewamo-Westphalia Community Schools (also extends into Ionia County)
St. Johns Public Schools (also extends into Gratiot County)

Copper Country Intermediate School District

Baraga County
Arvon Township School District
Baraga Area Schools (also extends into Houghton County)
L'Anse Area Schools (also extends into Houghton and Ontonagon Counties)

Houghton County
Adams Township School District (also extends into Ontonagon County)
Chassell Township School District
Dollar Bay-Tamarack City Area K-12 School
Elm River Township School District
Hancock Public Schools
Houghton-Portage Township School District
Lake Linden-Hubbell School District (also extends into Keweenaw County)
Public Schools of Calumet, Laurium & Keweenaw (also extends into Keweenaw County)
Stanton Township Public Schools

Keweenaw County
Grant Township School District 2

Delta–Schoolcraft Intermediate School District

Delta County
Bark River-Harris School District (also extends into Menominee County, where the district offices are located)
Big Bay de Noc School District (also extends into Schoolcraft County)
Escanaba Area Public Schools (also extends into Marquette County)
Gladstone Area Schools
Mid Peninsula School District (also extends into Marquette County)
Rapid River Public Schools

Schoolcraft County
Manistique Area Schools

Dickinson–Iron Intermediate School District

Dickinson County
Breitung Township School District
Iron Mountain Public Schools
North Dickinson County Schools
Norway-Vulcan Area Schools (also extends into Menominee County)

Iron County
Forest Park School District
West Iron County Public Schools

Eastern Upper Peninsula Intermediate School District

Chippewa County
Brimley Area Schools
DeTour Area Schools
Pickford Public Schools (also extends into Mackinac County)
Rudyard Area Schools (also extends into Mackinac County)
Sault Ste. Marie Area Schools
Whitefish Township Schools

Luce County
Tahquamenon Area Schools (also extends into Chippewa, Mackinac and Schoolcraft Counties)

Mackinac County
Bois Blanc Pines School District
Engadine Consolidated Schools
Les Cheneaux Community Schools
Mackinac Island Public Schools
Moran Township School District
St. Ignace Area Schools

Eaton Regional Education Service Agency

Eaton County
Charlotte Public Schools
Eaton Rapids Public Schools (also extends into Ingham County)
Grand Ledge Public Schools (also extends into Clinton and Ionia Counties)
Maple Valley Schools (also extends into Barry County)
Oneida Township School District 3
Potterville Public Schools

Genesee Intermediate School District

Genesee County
Atherton Community Schools
Beecher Community School District
Bendle Public Schools
Bentley Community School District
Carman-Ainsworth Community Schools
Clio Area School District (also extends into Saginaw County)
Davison Community Schools (also extends into Lapeer County)
Fenton Area Public Schools (also extends into Livingston and Oakland Counties)
School District of the City of Flint
Flushing Community Schools
Genesee School District
Goodrich Area Schools (also extends into Lapeer and Oakland Counties)
Grand Blanc Community Schools (also extends into Oakland County)
Kearsley Community Schools
Lake Fenton Community Schools
LakeVille Community School District (also extends into Lapeer County)
Linden Community Schools (also extends into Livingston County)
Montrose Community Schools (also extends into Saginaw County)
Mt. Morris Consolidated Schools
Swartz Creek Community Schools
Westwood Heights Schools

Gogebic–Ontonagon Intermediate School District

Gogebic County
Bessemer Area School District
Ironwood Area Schools of Gogebic County
Wakefield-Marenisco School District
Watersmeet Township School District

Ontonagon County
Ewen-Trout Creek Consolidated School District (also extends into Houghton County)
Ontonagon Area School District

Gratiot–Isabella Regional Education Service District

Gratiot County
Alma Public Schools (also extends into Montcalm County)
Ashley Community Schools (also extends into Saginaw County)
Breckenridge Community Schools (also extends into Midland and Saginaw Counties)
Fulton Schools (also extends into Clinton County)
Ithaca Public Schools
St. Louis Public Schools (also extends into Isabella and Midland Counties)

Isabella County
Beal City Public Schools
Mt. Pleasant City School District
Shepherd Public Schools

Heritage Southwest Intermediate School District

Cass County
Cassopolis Public Schools
Dowagiac Union School District (also extends into Berrien and Van Buren Counties)
Edwardsburg Public Schools
Marcellus Community Schools (also extends into St. Joseph County)

Hillsdale Intermediate School District

Hillsdale County
Camden-Frontier Schools (also extends into Branch County)
Hillsdale Community Schools
Jonesville Community Schools (also extends into Jackson County)
Litchfield Community Schools (also extends into Branch, Calhoun and Jackson Counties)
North Adams-Jerome Public Schools (also extends into Jackson County)
Pittsford Area Schools
Reading Community Schools (also extends into Branch County)
Waldron Area Schools

Huron Intermediate School District

Huron County
Bad Axe Public Schools
Caseville Public Schools
Church School District
Colfax Township School District 1F
Elkton-Pigeon-Bay Port Laker Schools
Harbor Beach Community Schools (also extends into Sanilac County)
North Huron School District
Owendale-Gagetown Area School District (also extends into Tuscola County)
Sigel Township School District 3F
Sigel Township School District 4F
Ubly Community Schools (also extends into Sanilac County)
Verona Township School District 1F

Ingham Intermediate School District

Ingham County
Dansville Schools
East Lansing School District (also extends into Clinton County)
Haslett Public Schools (also extends into Clinton and Shiawassee Counties)
Holt Public Schools (also extends into Eaton County)
Lansing Public School District (also extends into Clinton and Eaton Counties)
Leslie Public Schools (also extends into Jackson County)
Mason Public Schools (Ingham)
Okemos Public Schools
Stockbridge Community Schools (also extends into Jackson, Livingston and Washtenaw Counties)
Waverly Community Schools (also extends into Eaton, where the district offices are located, and Clinton Counties)
Webberville Community Schools (also extends into Livingston County)
Williamston Community Schools

Ionia Intermediate School District

Ionia County
Belding Area School District (also extends into Kent and Montcalm Counties)
Berlin Township School District 3
Easton Township School District 6
Ionia Public Schools
Ionia Township School District 2
Lakewood Public Schools (also extends into Barry, Eaton and Kent Counties)
Portland Public Schools (also extends into Clinton County)
Saranac Community Schools

Iosco Regional Educational Service Agency

Iosco County
Hale Area Schools (also extends into Ogemaw County)
Oscoda Area Schools (also extends into Alcona County)
Tawas Area Schools (also extends into Arenac County)
Whittemore-Prescott Area Schools (also extends into Arenac and Ogemaw Counties)

Jackson Intermediate School District

Jackson County
Columbia School District (also extends into Hillsdale, Lenawee and Washtenaw Counties)
Concord Community Schools
East Jackson Community Schools
Grass Lake Community Schools (also extends into Washtenaw County)
Hanover-Horton School District (also extends into Hillsdale County)
Jackson Public Schools
Michigan Center School District
Napoleon Community Schools
Northwest Community Schools (also extends into Ingham County)
Springport Public Schools (also extends into Calhoun, Eaton and Ingham Counties)
Vandercook Lake Public Schools
Western School District

Kalamazoo Regional Educational Service Agency

Kalamazoo County
Climax-Scotts Community Schools (also extends into Calhoun County)
Comstock Public Schools
Galesburg-Augusta Community Schools
Gull Lake Community Schools (also extends into Barry and Calhoun Counties)
Kalamazoo Public Schools
Parchment School District
Portage Public Schools
Schoolcraft Community Schools
Vicksburg Community Schools (also extends into St. Joseph County)

Kent Intermediate School District

Barry County
Thornapple Kellogg School District (also extends into Allegan, Ionia and Kent Counties)

Kent County
Byron Center Public Schools
Caledonia Community Schools (also extends into Allegan and Barry Counties)
Cedar Springs Public Schools (also extends into Newaygo County)
Comstock Park Public Schools
East Grand Rapids Public Schools
Forest Hills Public Schools
Godfrey-Lee Public Schools
Godwin Heights Public Schools
Grand Rapids Public Schools
Grandville Public Schools (also extends into Ottawa County)
Kelloggsville Public Schools
Kenowa Hills Public Schools (also extends into Ottawa County)
Kent City Community Schools (also extends into Muskegon, Newaygo and Ottawa Counties)
Kentwood Public Schools
Lowell Area Schools (also extends into Ionia County)
Northview Public Schools
Rockford Public Schools
Sparta Area Schools (also extends into Ottawa County)
Wyoming Public Schools

Lapeer Intermediate School District

Lapeer County
Almont Community Schools (also extends into Macomb, Oakland and St. Clair Counties)
Dryden Community Schools
Imlay City Community Schools
Lapeer Community Schools
North Branch Area Schools

Lenawee Intermediate School District

Lenawee County
Addison Community Schools (also extends into Hillsdale and Jackson Counties)
Adrian Public Schools
Blissfield Community Schools (also extends into Monroe County)
Britton-Deerfield Schools (also extends into Monroe County)
Clinton Community Schools (also extends into Washtenaw County)
Hudson Area Schools (also extends into Hillsdale County)
Madison School District (Lenawee)
Morenci Area Schools
Onsted Community Schools
Sand Creek Community Schools
Tecumseh Public Schools

Livingston Educational Service Agency

Livingston County
Brighton Area Schools
Fowlerville Community Schools (also extends into Ingham and Shiawassee Counties)
Hartland Consolidated Schools
Howell Public Schools
Pinckney Community Schools (also extends into Washtenaw County)

Macomb Intermediate School District

Macomb County
Anchor Bay School District (also extends into St. Clair County, where the district offices are located)
Armada Area Schools (also extends into St. Clair County)
Center Line Public Schools
Chippewa Valley Schools
Clintondale Community Schools
Eastpointe Community Schools
Fitzgerald Public Schools
Fraser Public Schools
Lake Shore Public Schools (Macomb)
Lakeview Public Schools (Macomb)
L'Anse Creuse Public Schools
Mount Clemens Community School District
New Haven Community Schools
Richmond Community Schools (also extends into St. Clair County)
Romeo Community Schools (also extends into Oakland County)
Roseville Community Schools
South Lake Schools
Utica Community Schools
Van Dyke Public Schools
Warren Consolidated Schools (also extends into Oakland County)
Warren Woods Public Schools

Manistee Intermediate School District

Manistee County
Bear Lake School District
Kaleva Norman Dickson School District (also extends into Lake and Mason Counties)
Manistee Area Public Schools (also extends into Mason County)
Onekama Consolidated Schools

Marquette–Alger Regional Educational Service Agency

Alger County
AuTrain-Onota Public Schools
Burt Township School District
Munising Public Schools (also extends into Schoolcraft County)
Superior Central School District

Marquette County
Gwinn Area Community Schools
Ishpeming Public School District No. 1
Marquette Area Public Schools
Negaunee Public Schools
NICE Community School District (also extends into Baraga County)
Powell Township Schools
Republic-Michigamme Schools
Wells Township School District

Mecosta–Osceola Intermediate School District

Mecosta County
Big Rapids Public Schools (also extends into Newaygo County)
Chippewa Hills School District (also extends into Isabella and Osceola Counties)
Morley Stanwood Community Schools (also extends into Montcalm and Newaygo Counties)

Osceola County
Evart Public Schools (also extends into Clare and Mecosta Counties)
Reed City Area Public Schools (also extends into Lake, Mecosta and Newaygo Counties)

Menominee Intermediate School District

Menominee County
Carney-Nadeau Public Schools
Menominee Area Public Schools
North Central Area Schools
Stephenson Area Public Schools

Midland County Educational Service Agency

Midland County
Bullock Creek School District
Coleman Community Schools (also extends into Isabella County)
Meridian Public Schools
Midland Public Schools

Monroe Intermediate School District

Monroe County
Airport Community Schools (also extends into Wayne County)
Bedford Public Schools
Dundee Community Schools
Ida Public Schools
Jefferson Schools (Monroe)
Mason Colsolidated Schools (Monroe)
Monroe Public Schools
Summerfield Schools
Whiteford Agricultural School District of the Counties of Lenawee and Monroe (also extends into Lenawee County)

Montcalm Area Intermediate School District

Montcalm County
Carson City-Crystal Area Schools (also extends into Clinton, Gratiot and Ionia Counties)
Central Montcalm Public Schools (also extends into Ionia Counties)
Greenville Public Schools (also extends into Ionia and Kent Counties)
Lakeview Community Schools (Montcalm) (also extends into Kent and Mecosta Counties)
Montabella Community Schools (also extends into Isabella and Mecosta Counties)
Tri County Area Schools (also extends into Kent and Newaygo Counties)
Vestaburg Community Schools (also extends into Gratiot and Isabella Counties)

Muskegon Area Intermediate School District

Muskegon County
Fruitport Community Schools (also extends into Ottawa County)
Holton Public Schools (also extends into Newaygo and Oceana Counties)
Mona Shores Public School District
Montague Area Public Schools (also extends into Oceana County)
Muskegon Heights School District
Public Schools of the City of Muskegon
North Muskegon Public Schools
Oakridge Public Schools (also extends into Newaygo County)
Orchard View Schools
Ravenna Public Schools (also extends into Ottawa County)
Reeths-Puffer Schools
Whitehall District Schools

Newaygo County Regional Educational Service Agency

Newaygo County
Big Jackson School District
Fremont Public School District (also extends into Muskegon and Oceana Counties)
Grant Public School District (also extends into Kent and Muskegon Counties)
Hesperia Community Schools (also extends into Oceana County)
Newaygo Public School District
White Cloud Public Schools

Northwest Educational Services

Antrim County
Alba Public Schools
Bellaire Public Schools
Elk Rapids Schools (also extends into Grand Traverse and Kalkaska Counties)
Mancelona Public Schools (also extends into Kalkaska Counties)

Benzie County
Benzie County Central Schools (also extends into Grand Traverse, Manistee and Wexford Counties)
Frankfort-Elberta Area Schools

Grand Traverse County
Buckley Community Schools (also extends into Wexford County, where the district offices are located)
Kingsley Area Schools (also extends into Wexford County)
Traverse City Area Public Schools (also extends into Benzie and Leelanau Counties)

Kalkaska County
Excelsior Township School District 1
Forest Area Community Schools (also extends into Grand Traverse County)
Kalkaska Public Schools

Leelanau County
Glen Lake Community Schools (also extends into Benzie County)
Leland Public School District
Northport Public School District
Suttons Bay Public Schools

Oakland Schools

Oakland County
Avondale School District
Berkley School District
Birmingham Public Schools
Bloomfield Hills Schools
Brandon School District in the Counties of Oakland and Lapeer (also extends into Genesee and Lapeer Counties)
Clarenceville School District (also extends into Wayne County, where the district offices are located)
Clarkston Community School District
Clawson City School District
Farmington Public School District
Ferndale Public Schools
School District of the City of Hazel Park
Holly Area School District
Huron Valley Schools (also extends into Livingston County)
Lake Orion Community Schools
Lamphere Public Schools
Madison District Public Schools
Novi Community School District
School District of the City of Oak Park
Oxford Community Schools (also extends into Lenawee and Macomb Counties)
Pontiac City School District
Rochester Community School District (also extends into Macomb County)
Royal Oak Schools
South Lyon Community Schools (also extends into Livingston and Washtenaw Counties)
Southfield Public School District
Troy School District
Walled Lake Consolidated Schools
Waterford School District
West Bloomfield School District

Ottawa Area Intermediate School District

Allegan County
Hamilton Community Schools
Saugatuck Public Schools

Ottawa County
Allendale Public Schools
Coopersville Area Public School District (also extends into Muskegon County)
Grand Haven Area Public Schools (also extends into Muskegon County)
Holland City School District (also extends into Allegan County)
Hudsonville Public School District (also extends into Allegan County)
Jenison Public Schools
Spring Lake Public Schools
West Ottawa Public School District
Zeeland Public Schools (also extends into Allegan County)

Saginaw Intermediate School District

Saginaw County
Birch Run Area Schools (also extends into Genesee County)
Bridgeport-Spaulding Community School District
Carrollton Public Schools
Chesaning Union Schools (also extends into Shiawassee County)
Frankenmuth School District (also extends into Tuscola County)
Freeland Community School District (also extends into Bay and Midland Counties)
Hemlock Public School District (also extends into Midland County)
Merrill Community Schools (also extends into Gratiot and Midland Counties)
Saginaw Township Community Schools
Saginaw City School District|School District of the City of Saginaw
St. Charles Community Schools
Swan Valley School District

Sanilac Intermediate School District

Sanilac County
Brown City Community Schools (also extends into Lapeer County)
Carsonville-Port Sanilac School District
Croswell-Lexington Community Schools (also extends into St. Clair County)
Deckerville Community School District
Marlette Community Schools (also extends into Lapeer and Tuscola Counties)
Peck Community School District
Sandusky Community School District

Shiawassee Regional Educational Service District

Shiawassee County
Byron Area Schools (also extends into Genesee and Livingston Counties)
Corunna Public Schools
Durand Area Schools (also extends into Genesee County)
Laingsburg Community Schools (also extends into Clinton County)
Morrice Area Schools (also extends into Ingham and Livingston Counties)
New Lothrop Area Public Schools (also extends into Saginaw Counties)
Owosso Public Schools
Perry Public Schools (also extends into Ingham County)

St. Clair County Regional Educational Service Agency

St. Clair County
Algonac Community School District
Capac Community Schools (also extends into Lapeer County)
East China School District
Marysville Public Schools
Memphis Community Schools (also extends into Macomb County)
Port Huron Area School District
Yale Public Schools (also extends into Sanilac County)

St. Joseph County Intermediate School District

St. Joseph County
Burr Oak Community School District
Centreville Public Schools
Colon Community School District (also extends into Branch and Kalamazoo Counties)
Constantine Public School District (also extends into Cass County)
Mendon Community School District (also extends into Kalamazoo County)
Nottawa Community School
Sturgis Public Schools
Three Rivers Community Schools (also extends into Cass County)
White Pigeon Community Schools (also extends into Cass County)

State of Michigan
State School Reform/Redesign District (offices located in Ingham County)

Tuscola Intermediate School District

Tuscola County
Akron-Fairgrove Schools
Caro Community Schools
Cass City Public Schools (also extends into Huron and Sanilac Counties)
Kingston Community School District
Mayville Community School District (also extends into Lapeer County)
Millington Community Schools (also extends into Genesee County)
Reese Public Schools (also extends into Bay and Saginaw Counties)
Unionville-Sebewaing Area School District (also extends into Huron County)
Vassar Public Schools

Van Buren Intermediate School District

Van Buren County
Bangor Public Schools (Van Buren)
Bangor Township School District 8
Bloomingdale Public School District (also extends into Allegan County)
Covert Public Schools (also extends into Berrien County)
Decatur Public Schools (also extends into Cass County)
Gobles Public School District (also extends into Allegan County)
Hartford Public Schools
Lawrence Public Schools
Lawton Community School District (also extends into Kalamazoo County)
Mattawan Consolidated School (also extends into Kalamazoo County)
Paw Paw Public School District
South Haven Public Schools (also extends into Allegan County)

Washtenaw Intermediate School District

Washtenaw County
Ann Arbor Public Schools
Chelsea School District (also extends into Jackson County)
Dexter Community School District (also extends into Livingston County)
Lincoln Consolidated School District (also extends into Wayne County)
Manchester Community Schools (also extends into Jackson County)
Milan Area Schools (also extends into Monroe County)
Saline Area Schools
Whitmore Lake Public School District (also extends into Livingston County)
Ypsilanti Community Schools

Wayne County Regional Educational Service Agency

Wayne County
Allen Park Public Schools
Crestwood School District
Dearborn City School District
Dearborn Heights School District 7
Detroit City School District
Detroit Public Schools Community District
Ecorse Public Schools
Flat Rock Community Schools (also extends into Monroe County)
Garden City Public Schools
Gibraltar School District
Grosse Ile Township Schools
Grosse Pointe Public Schools
School District of the City of Hamtramck
The School District of the City of Harper Woods
Highland Park City Schools
Huron School District (also extends into Monroe County)
School District of the City of Lincoln Park
Livonia Public Schools School District
Melvindale-North Allen Park Schools
Northville Public Schools (also extends into Oakland and Washtenaw Counties)
Plymouth-Canton Community Schools (also extends into Washtenaw County)
Redford Union Schools, District No. 1
School District of the City of River Rouge
Riverview Community School District
Romulus Community Schools
South Redford School District
Southgate Community School District
Taylor School District
Trenton Public Schools
Van Buren Public Schools (also extends into Washtenaw County)
Wayne-Westland Community School District
Westwood Community School District
Woodhaven-Brownstown School District
School District of the City of Wyandotte

West Shore Educational Service District

Lake County
Baldwin Community Schools (also extends into Newaygo County)

Mason County
Ludington Area School District
Mason County Central Schools (also extends into Lake and Oceana Counties)
Mason County Eastern Schools (also extends into Lake and Manistee Counties)

Oceana County
Hart Public School District
Pentwater Public School District (also extends into Mason County)
Shelby Public Schools
Walkerville Public Schools (also extends into Mason and Newaygo Counties

Wexford–Missaukee Intermediate School District

Missaukee County
Lake City Area School District
McBain Rural Agricultural Schools (also extends into Clare, Osceola and Wexford Counties)

Osceola County
Marion Public Schools (also extends into Clare County)
Pine River Area Schools (also extends into Lake and Wexford Counties)

Wexford County
Cadillac Area Public Schools (also extends into Lake and Osceola Counties)
Manton Consolidated Schools (also extends into Missaukee and Grand Traverse Counties)
Mesick Consolidated Schools (also extends into Manistee County)

References

External links
List of Michigan school districts from GreatSchools.net
Michigan Center for Educational Performance & Information Educational Entity Master

 local
Education